Austrofundulus is a genus of killifish in the family Rivulidae native to northern Colombia, northern Venezuela and southwestern Guyana. They are annual killifish where adults generally have a short life in temporary ponds or swamps and the eggs experience a period of drought, only hatching when again covered by water.

Species
Austrofundulus is closely related to Rachovia, and it has been suggested that the former should be merged into the latter.

There are currently 7 recognized species of Austrofundulus:

 Austrofundulus guajira Hrbek, Taphorn & Thomerson, 2005
 Austrofundulus leohoignei Hrbek, Taphorn & Thomerson, 2005
 Austrofundulus leoni Hrbek, Taphorn & Thomerson, 2005
 Austrofundulus limnaeus L. P. Schultz, 1949
 Austrofundulus myersi Dahl, 1958
 Austrofundulus rupununi Hrbek, Taphorn & Thomerson, 2005
 Austrofundulus transilis G. S. Myers, 1932

References

Rivulidae